European Criterium is a series of international and inter-club figure skating competitions. First organised in the 1997–98 season, it is open to skaters who are members of European clubs.

Age categories 
The competitions are organised in the following age categories:
Chicks (Girls and Boys),
Cubs (Girls and Boys - 8 and 9 years old),
Springs (Girls and Boys - 10 and 11 years old),
Debs (Girls and Boys - 12 and 13 years old),
Novices (Girls and Boys - 14 and 15 years old),
Juniors (Ladies and Boys)
Seniors.

Skaters compete in several events, earning points for their placements. The points are added together to produce the final standings, which lead to the final competition (Coppa Europa).

Competitions
Competitions which are part of the series include:
Skate Celje, held in early November in Celje, Slovenia. Named since 2002–03 season.
Skate Helena, held in Belgrade, Serbia.
Sofia Trophy, held in Sofia, Bulgaria.
Sportland Trophy (formerly Rozmaring-Titanium Trophy), held in March in Budapest, Hungary. Named since 2004–05 season.
Coppa Europa (Trofeo U.I.S.P.), held in late March to early April in Canazei, Italy. Named since 1989–90 season.

Formerly part of the series
Hellmut Seibt Memorial, held in February in Vienna, Austria.
Brno Cup, held in January in Brno, Czech Republic. Named since 2004–05 season.
Mozart Cup, held in January in Salzburg, Austria. Named since 2006–07 season.

Events by season

2021–22
 Skate Celje in Celje, Slovenia
 Skate Helena in Belgrade, Serbia
 Sofia Trophy in Sofia, Bulgaria
 Bellu Memorial in Bucharest, Romania
 Sebestyén Cup in Budapest, Hungary

2020–21
 Sofia Trophy in Sofia, Bulgaria
 Skate Celje in Celje, Slovenia
 Skate Helena in Belgrade, Serbia

2019–20
 Skate Celje in Celje, Slovenia
 Skate Helena in Belgrade, Serbia
 Sofia Trophy in Sofia, Bulgaria
 Coppa Europa - Trofeo U.I.S.P. in Folgaria, Italy

2018–19
 Skate Celje in Celje, Slovenia
 Skate Helena in Belgrade, Serbia
 Sofia Trophy in Sofia, Bulgaria
 Coppa Europa - Trofeo U.I.S.P. in Folgaria, Italy
 Skate Victoria in Sofia, Bulgaria

2017–18
 Skate Celje in Celje, Slovenia
 Skate Helena in Belgrade, Serbia
 Sofia Trophy in Sofia, Bulgaria
 Mayrin-Geneve in Geneve, Switzerland
 Coppa Europa - Trofeo U.I.S.P. in Folgaria, Italy

2016–17
 Skate Celje in Celje, Slovenia
 Skate Helena in Belgrade, Serbia
 Sofia Trophy in Sofia, Bulgaria
 Mayrin-Geneve in Geneve, Switzerland
 Coppa Europa - Trofeo U.I.S.P. in Canazei, Italy

2015–16
 Skate Celje in Celje, Slovenia
 9th Skate Helena in Belgrade, Serbia
 Sofia Trophy in Sofia, Bulgaria
 Sportland Trophy in Budapest, Hungary
 Coppa Europa U.S.I.P Trophy

2013–14 season

2011–12 season
 Skate Celje 2011 - Celje (Slovenia), 10–14 November 
 4th Europa Cup Skate Helena - Belgrade (Serbia) 
 Feldkirch Trophy 2012 - Feldkirch (Austra), 18-21 February 
 Rozmaring-Sportorszag Trophy - Budapest (Hungary), 2-3 March 
 Coppa Europa Trofeo U.I.S.P. - Canazei (Italy), 9–14 April

2009–10 season

2008–09 season

2007–08 season

2006–07 season 
 Skate Celje - Celje, 9–12 November , 
 Mozart Cup - Salzburg, 17–21 January , 
 Hellmut Seibt Memorial - Vienna, 6–11 February 
 Rozmaring-Titanium Trophy - Budapest, 7–11 March 
 European Criterium Final - Canazei (Italy), 31 March-6 April

2005–06 season 
 Skate Celje - Celje, 9–13 November 
 Brno Cup - Brno, 7–8 January - CANCELLED
 Hellmut-Seibt Memorial - Vienna, 31 January-5 February
 Titanium-Rozmaring Trophy - Budapest, 8–12 March 
 Coppa Europa-Trofeo U.I.S.P - Pinzolo, 31 March-6 April 
Final standings

2004–05 season 
 Skate Celje - Celje, 10–14 November 
 Brno Cup - Brno, 6–9 January 
 Hellmut Seibt Memorial - Vienna, 8–13 February,
 Rozmaring Trophy - Budapest, 9–13 March 
 EC Italy - Pinzolo, 1–7 April 
Final standings

2003–04 season 
 Skate Celje - Celje, 6–9 November 
 EC Czech Republic - Brno, 16–19 December 
 Hellmut Seibt Memorial - Vienna, 17–22 February 
 EC Hungary - Budapest, 11–14 March 
 EC Poland - Warsaw, March - CANCELLED
 EC Italy - Pinzolo, 2–8 April 
Final standings

2002–03 season 
 Skate Celje - Celje, 6–11 November 
 EC Czech Republic - Brno, 7–10 January 
 EC Hungary - Budapest, 30 January-2 February 
 Hellmut Seibt Memorial - Vienna, 11–16 February 
 EC Poland - Warsaw, 6–9 March 
 EC Italy - Bolzano, 7–13 April 
Final standings

2001–02 season 
 EC Slovenia - Celje, 7–11 November 
 EC Czech Republic - Brno, 3–6 January 
 EC Hungary - Budapest, 1–3 February - CANCELLED
 Helmut Seibt Memorial - Vienna, 19–24 February 
 EC Poland - Warsaw, 7–10 March 
 EC Italy - Asiago, 8–13 April 
Final standings

2000–01 season 
 EC Slovenia - Celje, 9–12 November 
 EC Czech Republic - Brno, 5–7 January 
 EC Poland - Warsaw, 10–14 January 
 EC Hungary - Székesfehérvár, 8–11 February 
 Helmut Seibt Memorial - Vienna, 11–16 February 
 EC Italy - Asiago, 9–14 April 
Final standings

1999–2000 season 
 EC Slovenia - Celje, 18–20 November
 EC Czech Republic - Brno, 7–9 January
 EC Poland - Warsaw, 20–23 January 
 EC Hungary - Dunaújváros, 17–20 February 
 EC Austria - Vienna, 22–26 February 
 EC Italy - Asiago, 9–15 April 
Final standings

1998–99 season 
 EC Czech Republic - Brno, 7–10 January 
 EC Hungary - Budapest, 4–7 February 
 EC Austria - Vienna, 24–27 February 
 EC Slovenia - Celje, 18–21 March 
 EC Italy - Pinzolo, 13–18 April 
Final standings

1997–98 season 
 EC Slovenia - Celje, 13–16 November 
 EC Czech Republic - Brno, 23–25 January 
 EC Hungary - Budapest, 5–8 February 
 EC Poland - Warsaw, 5–8 March 
 EC Italy - Pinzolo, 7–13 April 
Final standings

References 
European Criterium competitions
The Figure Skating Corner
European Criterium results

Figure skating competitions
Figure skating in Europe